The Ganaraska Region Conservation Authority is a conservation authority in the Canadian province of Ontario. It was established in October 1946 via the Conservation Authorities Act, and is a member authority of Conservation Ontario.

The authority is responsible for the management and protection of the Ganaraska River watershed in Northumberland County and the Regional Municipality of Durham in Southern Ontario.

Conservation areas
Ganaraska Region Conservation Authority manages nine conservation areas:

Ball's Mills Conservation Area
Ganaraska Millenium Conservation Area
Rice Lake Conservation Area
Cobourg Conservation Area
Garden Hill Conservation Area
Richardson's Lookout Conservation Area
Thurne Parks Conservation Area
Port Hope Conservation Area
Sylvan Glen Conservation Area

External links

Conservation authorities in Ontario